Sardar Sanaullah Khan Zehri  is a Pakistani politician who had been the Chief Minister of Balochistan from 24 December 2015, to 9 December 2017. He belongs to Channal Zarakzai family and also the Sardar of the Zehri tribe and chief of Jhalawan. Zehri succeeded Abdul Malik Baloch as chief minister Balochistan, Pakistan on 24 December 2015 as part of the power sharing deal brokered in the resort town of Murree. Zehri was the central president of the Pakistan Muslim League's Balochistan branch and a confidant of former Prime Minister Nawaz Sharif He left the PML-N on 7 November 2020.

On 7 June 2013, Zehri was appointed senior minister of Balochistan with portfolios of communication works, mines, minerals,   On 9 January 2018, due to the imminence of a no-confidence vote against him, Zehri resigned from his post as chief minister to prevent the brewing of a political crisis.

Biography
Nawab Sanaullah Zehri was born  in Anjeera in the Khuzdar District, Balochistan, Pakistan, on 4 August 1961. His father, Sardar Doda Khan Zehri, was a tribal leader and an activist in the Pakistan Movement who played a crucial role in gathering Balochistan's support for the cause of Pakistan. He graduated with a BA degree in political science in 1983 from the University of Balochistan.

Upon graduating from Balochistan University, he ran in the 1990 Balochistan Assembly general election, performing well on the PML(N)'s conservative platform. During this time, he campaigned for local government in Balochistan. In 1997, he contested and triumphed in a senate election, representing Balochistan until 1999. Zehri ran for the PB-50 (Khuzdar-I) constituency on the National Party's platform during the 2002 general election. He served as the provincial minister of prisons and tribal affairs until 2003.

In 2008, the National Party boycotted the general election. Zehri disagreed with the move, leaving the party, and in February he won a seat in the assembly under his own, newly founded the National Party.In September 2006, Zehri participated in a loya jirga called by the Khan of Kalat, Mir Suleman Dawood Jan, following the death of Akbar Bugti.

On 6 January 2010, he joined the Pakistan Muslim League. In August 2011, Baloch was selected by PML(N) as the assistant secretary general of the PML-N for Balochistan.

In 2013, Zehri defended his constituency on PML-N's platform and was initially named as candidacy for Chief Minister of Balochistan. However, Prime Minister Nawaz Sharif instead approved the appointment of Abdul Malik Baloch as the chief minister of Balochistan.

On 16 April 2013, Zehri escaped an assassination attempt on his life when his convoy came under a bomb attack in his native Khuzdar district. The attack killed his son, Sikander Zehri, brother Mir Meharullah Zehri and nephew Mir Zaid. The Balochistan Liberation Army (BLA), claimed responsibility for the attack on Zehri.

On 23 November 2020, Sanaullah lost his daughter Ayesha Zehri allegedly due to Covid 19.

Further reading

References

External links
Peace top priority, says Zehri

Living people
1961 births
Balochistan MPAs 1990–1993
Balochistan MPAs 2002–2007
Balochistan MPAs 2013–2018
Brahui people
Chief Ministers of Balochistan, Pakistan
Members of the Senate of Pakistan
Nawabs of Balochistan, Pakistan
Nawabs of Pakistan
Pakistan Muslim League (N) politicians
Pakistan People's Party politicians
Provincial ministers of Balochistan
People from Khuzdar District
University of Balochistan alumni
University of Karachi alumni